= Minoo Maddah =

Iranian taekwondo practitioner

Personal information
- Native name: مینو مداح
- Nationality: Iranian
- Born: 17 May 1976 (age 49) Karaj, Iran
- Weight: 73 kg (161 lb)

Sport
- Country: Iran
- Sport: Taekwondo
- Event: Finweight (–73 kg)

Minoo Maddah (born 17 May 1976) is an Iranian taekwondo practitioner and Coach.

== The women's team's performance ==
Minoo Maddah, the head coach of the women's national taekwondo team, regarding the criticisms of the women's team's performance and the comparison of this team with the men's team in terms of results, said: 'Comparing the women's team with the men's in terms of figures and number of medals is not correct at all because they are not in equal conditions.' The men's team sent 4 athletes in each weight to support each other. Each of these players, when they won, removed one opponent from the 16-player table, which was a point for our men's team. She also, in response to the question that it seems that due to the sending of 5 female taekwondo players against 16 male athletes to the Grand Slam competitions, the women's team is not given serious attention, said: 'The number and potential of the men's team are not the same as the women's.' Anyway, sending our 5 taekwondo players to these competitions was useful. It is possible that the federation may oppose sending more members of the women's team to the matches due to financial conditions or many other issues, for example, because of the fear of how they will respond after not getting the results. But we should never pay attention to what is said after the match, and I also don't pay attention to criticisms, because a critic's job is to criticize. We even became the champion of Asia, and they criticized us. If we have a long-term view, regardless of any result, we must send women to international competitions so that they can progress as much as possible by gaining experience. If we have a supportive view of women, instead of numerous criticisms, we can give them a chance to repeat good results such as the Asian Championship and the Islamic Games.
